John Pickering (February 7, 1777 - May 5, 1846) was an American linguist. He was president of the American Academy of Arts and Sciences, from 1839 to 1846. He was elected to the American Philosophical Society.

He graduated from Harvard University. He worked on the orthography of native languages.

He is buried at Broad Street Cemetery.

Family 
His father was Timothy Pickering.

Works 

 A Vocabulary, or, Collection of Words and Phrases Which Have Supposed to Be Peculiar to the U.S. of America (1816)

References 

Linguists from the United States
Members of the American Philosophical Society
Harvard University alumni
1777 births
1846 deaths